Glaucocharis ochrophanes is a moth in the family Crambidae. It was described by Edward Meyrick in 1931. It is found in Assam, India.

References

Diptychophorini
Moths described in 1931